Temtchine is a surname.  Notable people with the surname include:

 Chloe Temtchine (born  1982/1983), American singer-songwriter
 Sybil Temtchine (born 1979), American actress